Twice Upon a Christmas is a 2001 film directed by Tibor Takács. A sequel to the 2000 PAX television film, Once Upon a Christmas, it stars most of the original cast from the first film.  The filming location was in Vancouver, British Columbia.

Plot 
After Kristin saved Kyle's life, she has been living with the Morgan family ever since. Unfortunately, she cannot remember her past, and has lost her immortality. Bill proposes to her, but she declines, as she says she doesn't feel right about the decision without knowing her family. At the North Pole, Rudolpha is secretly selling pieces of the North Pole worldwide to get rid of the North Pole, and to make Santa Claus feel he is being replaced. As Kristin is preparing her wedding with Bill, Brittany and Kyle, Bill's two children, order from Rudolpha's business, and unknowingly receive Kristin's doll from when she was a little girl. After Kristin sees the doll, she immediately remembers her past, as flashbacks are shown of her life until then (with many using footage from Once Upon a Christmas). After Kristin sees Rudolpha's commercial, she and the children discover Rudolpha's plan, and head for the North Pole to try to save Christmas. With a special announcement the pieces are returned and Christmas saved. Rudolpha must ride since the deer have not come back. Kristen and Bill get married.

Cast

Home media
CBS Home Entertainment through Paramount Home Entertainment released the film on DVD November 7, 2006.

See also
 List of Christmas films
 Santa Claus in film

External links

2001 television films
2001 films
American television films
American Christmas films
Canadian drama television films
Canadian Christmas comedy films
English-language Canadian films
2000s English-language films
Television sequel films
American romantic fantasy films
2001 romantic comedy-drama films
Santa Claus in film
Santa Claus in television
American romantic comedy-drama films
Canadian romantic comedy-drama films
Christmas television films
Films shot in Vancouver
American Christmas comedy films
2000s Christmas films
Cultural depictions of Donald Trump
2001 comedy-drama films
Films directed by Tibor Takács
2000s American films
2000s Canadian films